Jorge Terán (22 March 1935 – January 2015) was a Mexican sprinter. He competed in the men's 400 metres at the 1960 Summer Olympics.

References

1935 births
2015 deaths
Athletes (track and field) at the 1959 Pan American Games
Athletes (track and field) at the 1960 Summer Olympics
Mexican male sprinters
Olympic athletes of Mexico
Place of birth missing
Central American and Caribbean Games medalists in athletics
Pan American Games competitors for Mexico
20th-century Mexican people